Serra do Cachimbo is a low mountain range in Brazil, in the southern part of the state of Pará, located mostly in the municipalities of Altamira, Itaituba, Jacareacanga, and Novo Progresso.

The Serra do Cachimbo complex is partly a continuous mass of mountains with a south west alignment, partly plateau with flat-bottomed valleys.
Erosion has created ridges and ravines. In the northern part there are escarpments along the transition to the peripheral depression of southern Pará, where the rivers descend in rapids and waterfalls such as the Salto do Curuá.

The Nascentes da Serra do Cachimbo Biological Reserve covers part of the range.
The Iriri River and its tributaries (notably Curuá River) rises in the Serra do Cachimbo and flows for  before joining the Xingu River. It is the main river of the  Terra do Meio Ecological Station. The Jamanxim River, a tributary of the Tapajós, also rises in the Serra do Cachimbo. Jamanxim, Curuá and other rivers of Serra do Cachimbo are home to many endemic fish. Several of these are threatened by habitat loss and proposed dams, although there are also a few like Phycocharax rasbora that benefit from the reservoirs created by dams. Serra do Cachimbo is very rich in birds with more than 380 registered species. This richness is in part explained by the diversity of habitats, as it is in a region mostly covered by Amazon rainforest, but the Serra also has isolated patches of Cerrado vegetation.

Campo de Provas Brigadeiro Velloso is a large complex of the Brazilian Armed Forces, administrated by the Brazilian Air Force, located in Serra do Cachimbo. The complex includes the Cachimbo Airport.

References

Sources

Cachimbo
Landforms of Pará